Toppola is a brand of camper shell originally made for the Saab 99 combi coupé. By removing the hatch and putting on the Toppola a car could be converted to a campervan in about 15 to 30 minutes. The top can easily be lifted off and the hatch door reattached, so the car can be used without the Toppola. The unit is small, but features full standing height (2.0 m) and a 170 by 200 cm bed. It could be fitted with a complete kitchen and even a heater for use during winter.

The Toppola was first made for the Saab 99, but later also Saab 900, Saab 900 (NG), Saab 9000, Saab 9-3, Ford Sierra and Scorpio.

Production has stopped in 2006; SCANDO was looking for someone to take over production of the Toppola.

External links 

 Saab Central -  The Toppola Camper
 Dream Trip Home page of Catharina and Bert Öhman's trip around the world with a Saab 900 Toppola
 Toppola on the internet - most in Swedish

Recreational vehicle manufacturers